Lithopone, C.I. Pigment White 5, is a mixture of inorganic compounds, widely used as a white pigment powder.  It is composed of a mixture of barium sulfate and zinc sulfide. These insoluble compounds blend well with organic compounds and confer opacity.  It was made popular by the cheap production costs, greater coverage.  Related white pigments include titanium dioxide, zinc oxide ("zinc white"), zinc sulfide, and white lead.

History 
Lithopone was discovered in the 1870s by DuPont. It was manufactured by Krebs Pigments and Chemical Company and other companies. The material came in different "seals", which varied in the content of zinc sulfide.  Gold seal and Bronze seals contain 40-50% zinc sulfide, offering more hiding power and strength. Although its popularity peaked around 1920, approximately 223,352 tons were produced in 1990.  It is mainly used in paints, putty, and in plastics.

Stability and darkening
Although barium sulfate is almost completely inert, zinc sulfide degrades upon exposure to UV light, leading to darkening of the pigment.  The severity of this UV reaction is dependent on a combination of two factors; how much zinc sulfide makes up the pigments formulation, and its total accumulated UV exposure.  Depending on these factors the pigment itself can vary in shade over time, ranging from pure white all the way to grey or even black.  To suppress this effect, a dopant may be used, such as a small amount of cobalt salts, which would be added to the formulation.  This process creates cobalt-doped zinc sulfide.  The cobalt salts help to stabilize zinc sulfide so it will not have as severe a reaction to UV exposure.

Production 
Lithopone is produced by coprecipitation of barium sulfate and zinc sulfide.  Most commonly coprecipitation is effected by combining equimolar amounts of zinc sulfate and barium sulfide:
 BaS + ZnSO4→ ZnS · BaSO4
This route affords a product that is 29.4 wt % ZnS and 70.6 wt % BaSO4.  Variations exist, for example, more ZnS-rich materials are produced when zinc chloride is added to the mixture of zinc sulfate and barium sulfide.

Barium sulfide is produced by carbothermic reduction of barium sulfate.  Zinc sulfate is obtained from a variety of zinc products, often waste, by treatment with sulfuric acid.

Safety 
Lithopone is rather nontoxic, due to the insolubility of its components. It has been used in medicine as a radiocontrast agent. Lithopone is allowed to be in contact with foodstuffs in the US and Europe.

See also
 List of inorganic pigments

References

Historical references
.
. 

.
.

Barium compounds
Zinc compounds
Sulfides
Sulfates
Inorganic pigments
Radiocontrast agents